The 1990 New York gubernatorial election was held on November 6, 1990, to elect the Governor and Lieutenant Governor of New York. Democratic Governor Mario Cuomo won a third term in office, making him the first Democrat elected to three terms as Governor of New York since Herbert H. Lehman.

Though the Republican Party and Conservative Party had run the same candidate through fusion voting  since 1974, the parties diverged in 1990. The Republican Party nominated Pierre "Pete" Rinfret, a former presidential advisor who became a millionaire in the financial sector. The Conservative Party nominated Herbert London, the dean of NYU Gallatin. While Rinfret was a relative moderate who supported abortion rights, London was known as a staunch social and fiscal conservative. 

Cuomo won with an absolute majority of the vote, meaning that Rinfret and London's combined performance would not have been enough for a unified right flank to win. Had London received just 38,334 more votes, the Conservative Party would have secured Line B on all ballots in New York through the 1994 New York gubernatorial election. Additionally, the party would have been entitled to take over privileges designated for the two major parties, including authority over state and county Boards of Elections.

This election remains the best performance of the Conservative Party, both in terms of number of votes and percentage, for a gubernatorial election.

Democratic primary
Cuomo waited until June 1990 to officially announce his intention to run for a third term as governor, just 24 hours before the Democratic Party nominating convention. At the time, his approval rating hovered around 60% statewide, and his popularity meant that it was assumed that he would win reelection.

Candidates
Nominee
Mario Cuomo, incumbent Governor
Political commentators noted that Lieutenant Governor Stan Lundine was active on the 1990 campaign trail in a way he had not been four years prior. This was interpreted as an effort to boost his name recognition in order to run for Governor in an open field in 1994. However, Cuomo's decision to run for a fourth term in 1994 prevented this from occurring.

Republican primary
In early 1990, Rudy Giuliani and J. Patrick Barrett, Chair of the New York State Republican Party, were considered among the possible contenders for the Republican nomination for governor. 

Ultimately, Pierre Rinfret was chosen "by acclamation" as the Republican nominee for governor at the New York State Republican Convention held on May 30, 1990, in Rye Brook, New York.

Candidates
Nominee

 Pierre A. Rinfret, economist

Legacy 
Since this election, the closest a minor party has come to taking over Line B with a candidate of its own was in 2002, when Tom Golisano, running on the Independence Party line, received 14.28% of the vote behind Carl McCall's 31.50% on the Democratic line, a difference of 17.22%. 

The closest a single candidate has been on two different lines using fusion voting since the 1990 election was in 2006. In that election, John Faso received 23.54% on the Republican line and 3.59% on the Conservative line, a difference of 19.95%.

Results

References

1990
Gubernatorial
New York